Misael Bueno (born 15 July 1994), known as just Misael, is a Brazilian retired footballer who played as a midfielder.

Career
Misael finished his formation in Grêmio FBPA, and made his first team debut on 20 January 2013, in a 0–2 away win against Esportivo de Bento Gonçalves. He also featured against SC Canoas and SC Internacional. In March, he was linked to a move for Avaí FC, but nothing came of it. In June, he was released by Grêmio.

On 19 July 2013, Misael signed a two-year loan deal with Santos FC.

References

External links

1994 births
Living people
Brazilian footballers
Brazil youth international footballers
Footballers at the 2011 Pan American Games
Association football midfielders
Campeonato Brasileiro Série A players
Grêmio Foot-Ball Porto Alegrense players
Santos FC players
Coritiba Foot Ball Club players
Esporte Clube Rio Verde players
Deportivo Maldonado players
S.C. Freamunde players
Clube Esportivo Lajeadense players
Veranópolis Esporte Clube Recreativo e Cultural players
Pan American Games competitors for Brazil